Rafaela is a Spanish-language Mexican telenovela produced by Nathalie Lartilleux for Televisa, and aired on Canal de las Estrellas from January 31, 2011 to July 15, 2011. It is based on the Venezuelan telenovela of the same name produced in 1977.

Scarlet Ortiz and Jorge Poza starred as protagonists, while Diana Bracho, Chantal Andere, Arleth Terán, Arturo Carmona, Jan, Jorge Alberto Bolaños and Michelle Ramaglia starred as antagonists. Rogelio Guerra and Patricia Reyes Spíndola starred as stellar performances.

In the United States, Univision aired Rafaela from June 20, 2011 to October 14, 2011.

Cast

Main
 Scarlet Ortiz as Rafaela Martínez/Rafaela de la Vega Martínez - Rafael and Caridad's daughter, Morelia's stepdaughter, sister of Alicia, Rosalba, Luli, Belen, Chucho and Goyito, Arely's friend, ex-wife of Angel, in love with Jose Maria
 Jorge Poza as José María Báez - Mireya's husband, Ileana's ex-boyfriend, in love with Rafaela

Also main
 Diana Bracho as Morelia Echaverria de de La Vega - Alicia's mother and Rafaela's stepmother, Rafael's wife, Rene's aunt
 Chantal Andere as Mireya Vival de Báez - Jose Maria's wife, Morelia's friend and accomplice
 Rogelio Guerra as Dr. Rafael de la Vega - Rafaela and Alicia's father, Morelia's husband, in love with Caridad
 Patricia Reyes Spíndola as Caridad Martinez, sister in law of Morelia and mother of Rafaela, Rosalba, Belen, Luli, Chucho, and Goyito, Braulio's partner, Rafael's love interest
 Tiare Scanda as Rosalba Martinez - Caridad's daughter, sister of Rafaela, Belen, Luli, Goyito, and Chucho, in love with Carlos Luis
 Manuel "El Loco" Valdés as Braulio

Recurring
 Arleth Terán as Ileana Contreras - Jose Maria's ex-girlfriend, Alfredo's ex-wife, Mireya's accomplice
 Rubén Zamora  as Ángel Grajales - Rafaela's dedicated ex-husband
 Arturo Carmona as Victor Acuña - Footballer, Mireya's accomplice, obsessed with Rafaela
 Sheyla as Amanda - Nurse at the San Rafael Hospital, Rafaela's friend
 Ilean Almaguer as Alicia de la Vega Echaverria - Rafaela's sister, daughter of Morelia and Rafael, in love with Chucho
 Juan Carlos Flores as Chucho Martinez - Brother of Rafaela, Rosabla, Belen, Luli and Goyito, Caridad's son, in love with Alicia
 Arlette Pacheco as Amelia
 Isadora González as Elizabeth Jacome
 Jan as René Echevarría - Morelia's nephew
 Manuela Ímaz as Arely Herrera - Rafaela's friend, Carlos Luis's wife
 Juan Ángel Esparza as Carlos Luis Fernandez - Arely's husband
 Eduardo Rivera as Alfredo Contreras - Ileana's ex-husband
 Nicolás Menaas Raul Herrera
 Katherine Kellerman as Delia
 Silvia Ramírez as Camila Rojas
 Isabel Martínez "La Tarabilla" as Rosario
Michelle Ramaglia as Felipa
 Rosángela Balbó a Sara
 Theo Tapia as Ernesto
 Jorge Alberto Bolaños as Porfirio - Bar owner, in love with Rosalba
 Mario Sauret as Cosme
 Evelyn Cedeño as Belén Martínez - Caridad's daughter, sister of Rafaela, Rosalba, Luli, Chucho and Goyito
 arai Meza as Luli Martínez - Caridad's daughter, sister of Rafaela, Rosabla, Belen, Chucho and Goyito
 Emanuel Chikoto as Goyito Martínez' - Caridad's son, brother of Rafaela, Rosabla, Belen, Chucho and Luli
 Sergio Jurado as Bruno Yulyenette Anaya as RomanaLourdes Canale as Doña RocíoSilvia Suárez as SuzetteOscar Ferreti as CanitoHugo Macías Macotela as LinoGeraldine Galván as LupitaFernanda Ruiz as RefugioArturo Laphan as EnriqueHarding Junior as El NegroMayahuel del Monte as NinónAntonio Zamudio as CienfuegosOswaldo Zarate as El FlacoMarina Marín as FlorMaricruz Nájera as ConstanzaAna Isabel Corral as GenovevaRafael del Villar as FernandoAurora Clavel as RefugioSofía Tejeda as IsabelJavier Ruán as ChamulaBenjamín Rivero as FabiánMaría Sandoval as BertaNicolás Mena as RaúlRoberto Romano as Roger''

Awards

TVyNovelas Awards

References

External links

2011 telenovelas
2011 Mexican television series debuts
2011 Mexican television series endings
Television shows set in Mexico City
Mexican telenovelas
Televisa telenovelas
Medical telenovelas
Mexican television series based on Venezuelan television series
Spanish-language telenovelas